Singapur (Singapore) is the fifth album by Estonian rock band Terminaator. It was released in 1998.

Track listing 

 Aja teenija [The recruit, lit: time servant] (J.Hakulinen/J.Kreem) - 5:25
 Singapuri Lu [Lu of Singapore] (J.Kreem/J.Kreem) - 3:44
 Sinu juurde tagasi [Back to you] (J.Kreem/J.Kreem) - 4:08
 Baarman teab [Barman knows] (J.Kreem/J.Kreem) - 3:35
 Maanteepõletaja [Highway burner] (J.Kreem/J.Kreem) - 4:05
 Surmav suudlus [Deadly kiss] (E.Kaljulaid/J.Kreem) - 2:41
 Haige maailm [Sick world] (J.Kreem/Sulliwan/J.Kreem) - 3:04
 Alatud valed [Vile lies] (E.Kaljulaid/J.Kreem) - 5:13
 Preeriatuul [Prairie wind] (J.Kreem/J.Kreem) - 5:41
 Nr 666 [No 666] (J.Kreem/J.Kreem) - 3:08
 Koera elu (Tsau beibe) [Dog's life (Ciao baby)] (Terminaator/J.Kreem) - 2:49
 Televiisorimees [Televisor man] (J.Kreem/J.Kreem) - 2:40

Song information 

 "Aja teenija" is about not wanting to go to the army, also portraying it as being awful in every way. The song starts out with a speech performed by Väino Laes. It's the only song from this album to be featured on "Go Live 2005". Aja teenija is an Estonian version of Finnish Jussi Hakulinen's song  from his album Vaaleanpunainen majatalo (1985).
 Singapuri Lu is a fortuneteller, who always predicts bad things.
 "Sinu juurde tagasi" about missing somebody and thus having negative feelings.
 "Baarman teab" is about lowlifes spending nights in bars and contemplating about life.
 "Maanteepõletaja" is an ode to living to ride and riding to live.
 "Surmav suudlus" is a love song.
 "Haige maailm" is person- or society-critical.
 "Alatud valed" is about falseness, hypocrisy and self-admiring.
 "Preeriatuul" tells a story about an Indian, to whom an old chief foretells his death.
 "Nr 666" is about a gambler, who is a cheater.
 "Koera elu" is about a dog, whose girlfriend is not worth him ("ciao" as "bye", not as "hi").
 "Televiisorimees" is about a man, who watches too much TV and cuts himself off from everything else and whose life is led by TV. A live version is on "Head uudised".

Personnel
Jaagup Kreem - vocals, 12-strings
Sulev "Sulliwan" Müürsepp - guitar, harmonica, organ, flute, piano, vocals
Sven Valdmann - bass
Margus Valk - guitar
Eimel Kaljulaid - drum, synth, vocals
Rene Liitmaa - sound, technical supervisor

External links 
 Estmusic.com Listen to the songs.

1998 albums
Terminaator albums
Estonian-language albums